Maplewood is an unincorporated community in Middle Township, Hendricks County, Indiana.

The post office Maplewood once contained was originally called Progress, in 1880. The post office was renamed Maplewood in 1881, and closed in 1912.

Geography

References

Unincorporated communities in Hendricks County, Indiana
Unincorporated communities in Indiana
Indianapolis metropolitan area